Penehupifo "Penny" Pohamba (born 16 June 1948) is a Namibian nurse and politician who was the second First Lady of Namibia while her husband, Hifikepunye Pohamba, was President of Namibia from 2005 to 2015.

Early life
Pohamba was born in Okatale in Ohangwena Region, in the constituency of Oshikango close to the borders of Angola. Pohamba attended her primary and secondary school at Odibo with Jeremiah Nambinga and Joel Kaapanda. She was a school teacher at St George's Diocesan School in Windhoek.

Political career
Pohamba is a member of SWAPO. She married Malakias Shiluwa at St Mary's Odibo in 1969, and they have one son, Waldheim Shiluwa (born 1971). In 1976, she left Namibia via Angola and headed to Zambia. After a few months in Zambia, Pohamba was sent to Tanzania for medical training. She also received military training and worked in the camps where the refugees from Namibia were housed. She was then sent to Jamaica for a three-year period to study midwifery. Her husband (Malakias) was killed in a land mine explosion and by that time she had their daughter, Ndelitungapo Shiluwa (born 1973). She was sent back to Angola to practice her medical skills among her own people.

In August 1981, Pohamba was sent to East Germany to study politics at a college designed for Namibians. In 1983, she returned to Angola, where she married future President Hifikepunye Pohamba, and they had three children, Tulongeni (meaning "Let's work") (born 1986), Kaupumhote (meaning "In this world you will not finish the bad people") (born 1988) and Ndapanda (meaning "I'm grateful") (born 1991), who was born shortly after independence.

In her tenure as First Lady, Pohamba advocated for the empowerment of women to enable them to make a meaningful contribution to the development of society and fought for the eradication of violence and other forms of injustice against women. She has also been active in supporting maternal and child health-care, and also in the fight against HIV/AIDS. In July 2006, Penehupifo Pohamba was elected Vice-President for the Southern Africa Development Committee (SADC). She is a professional midwife after being trained in Tanzania and Jamaica. Before her husband became president, she practised as a midwife and registered nurse. She is also the patron of the Lady Pohamba Private Hospital (LPPH).

On Heroes' Day 2014 she was conferred the Most Brilliant Order of the Sun, First Class.

Private life
The Pohamba couple owns farm Guinaspoh #41 near Otavi. She is a mother of five (5), of which two (2) are boys and three girls.

External links
http://www.mtctnamibia.com/documents/firstlady.pdf

Sources

Notes

Further reading
http://myafrica.allafrica.com/view/people/main/id/08vheF1LZMkaZB5z.html

Living people
SWAPO politicians
First ladies of Namibia
People's Liberation Army of Namibia personnel
Namibian midwives
1948 births
Namibian nurses
People from Ohangwena Region
Namibian expatriates in the United Kingdom
Namibian expatriates in Kenya
20th-century Namibian women
20th-century Namibian people
21st-century Namibian women
21st-century Namibian people